Jagdeep Singh Deo s/o Karpal Singh (born 3 May 1971) is a Malaysian politician and lawyer who has served as Member of the Penang State Executive Council (EXCO) in the Pakatan Rakyat (PR) and Pakatan Harapan (PH) state administrations under Chief Ministers Lim Guan Eng and Chow Kon Yeow since May 2013 and Member of the Penang State Legislative Assembly (MLA) for Datok Keramat since March 2008. He is a member of the Democratic Action Party (DAP), a component party of the state and federal government PH and formerly PR coalitions. He is the eldest son of Karpal Singh, former Member of Parliament (MP) for Jelutong who gained fame and rose to prominence as the 'Tiger of Jelutong'. He is also the older brother of Gobind Singh Deo, former Minister of Communications and Multimedia and present Puchong MP as well as Ramkarpal Singh, present Bukit Gelugor MP.

Political career 
Jagdeep joined the Democratic Action Party (DAP) in 1994, following in the footsteps of his father, Karpal Singh. According to Jagdeep, although his father had by then established himself as a prominent DAP politician and lawyer, he was never pressured into entering the political scene, and that "it was his personal decision" to follow in his father's footsteps.

Jagdeep's first foray into politics was the 1999 Penang state election, during which he contested the Bukit Gelugor state constituency. However, he garnered only 38% of the popular vote and was defeated by Koay Kar Huah of the then ruling Barisan Nasional (BN) coalition.

In the 2008 Penang state election, Jagdeep wrested the state constituency of Datok Keramat from BN, defeating BN's incumbent Ong Thean Lye. The Pakatan Rakyat (now Pakatan Harapan) coalition, which at the time consisted of the DAP, the People's Justice Party (PKR) and the Malaysian Islamic Party (PAS), was voted into power within Penang, overthrowing the state's BN government.

Jagdeep successfully defended the Datok Keramat state constituency in the 2013 Penang state election with an increased majority. He was subsequently appointed as an Executive Councillor in the Penang state government by the then Chief Minister, Lim Guan Eng. Jagdeep's portfolios included the state's committees of housing, and urban and country planning.

In the 2018 Penang state election, Jagdeep once again emerged victorious in the Datok Keramat state constituency, further increasing his majority in the process, despite facing a five-cornered tussle for the seat. Following his success, his portfolios were expanded to include Penang's local government committee.

Executive Councillor 
Jagdeep's tenure as a member of the Penang State Executive Council has been notable for his aggressive drive towards increasing the supply of affordable public housing within the State of Penang. Prior to the 2018 Penang state election, 25,555 units of low- and medium-cost housing had been completed in the state, approximately five times greater than the amount built by the previous Barisan Nasional (BN) administration between 1999 and 2007. In addition to the completed units, nearly 50,000 more houses were being constructed within Penang. Jagdeep often contrasted his performance with the perceived refusal by the then BN-led federal government to build affordable housing units in the state, stating that the federal authorities had "failed to physically complete even one PR1MA affordable housing unit under their affordable housing scheme in Penang". He also put in place stringent conditions for prospective home buyers, requiring, for instance, that the applicants of government-built affordable housing units within Penang should be registered voters within the state.

Among Jagdeep's other initiatives are the construction of dormitories for foreign workers within Penang and flood mitigation projects within his constituency. The former, in particular, was mooted to resolve the issue of the uptake of housing units within the state by ineligible foreigners.

Election results

See also
Datok Keramat (state constituency)

References

External links
 Penang State Assembly Members

Living people
1971 births
People from Penang
20th-century Malaysian lawyers
Democratic Action Party (Malaysia) politicians
Malaysian politicians of Indian descent
Malaysian people of Punjabi descent
Malaysian Sikhs
Members of the Penang State Legislative Assembly
Penang state executive councillors
21st-century Malaysian politicians